The 2003–04 Colorado Avalanche season was the Avalanche's ninth season. For the first time since moving to Colorado, the Avalanche did not win their division. They defeated the Dallas Stars in the Quarterfinal round, but lost in the Semifinal round to the San Jose Sharks.

Offseason

Regular season

Final standings

Playoffs

Schedule and results

Regular season

|- align="center" bgcolor="#CCFFCC" 
|1||W||October 10, 2003||5–0 || align="left"|  Chicago Blackhawks (2003–04) ||1–0–0–0 || 
|- align="center" bgcolor="#FFBBBB"
|2||L||October 12, 2003||1–2 || align="left"|  St. Louis Blues (2003–04) ||1–1–0–0 || 
|- align="center" bgcolor="#CCFFCC" 
|3||W||October 16, 2003||5–2 || align="left"| @ Minnesota Wild (2003–04) ||2–1–0–0 || 
|- align="center" bgcolor="#FFBBBB"
|4||L||October 18, 2003||3–6 || align="left"| @ Edmonton Oilers (2003–04) ||2–2–0–0 || 
|- align="center" bgcolor="#FFBBBB"
|5||L||October 21, 2003||1–4 || align="left"|  Boston Bruins (2003–04) ||2–3–0–0 || 
|- align="center" bgcolor="#CCFFCC" 
|6||W||October 23, 2003||6–1 || align="left"|  Edmonton Oilers (2003–04) ||3–3–0–0 || 
|- align="center" bgcolor="#CCFFCC" 
|7||W||October 25, 2003||5–3 || align="left"| @ Nashville Predators (2003–04) ||4–3–0–0 || 
|- align="center" bgcolor="#FFBBBB"
|8||L||October 26, 2003||1–3 || align="left"|  Buffalo Sabres (2003–04) ||4–4–0–0 || 
|- align="center" bgcolor="#CCFFCC" 
|9||W||October 28, 2003||4–2 || align="left"|  Calgary Flames (2003–04) ||5–4–0–0 || 
|-

|- align="center" bgcolor="#FFBBBB"
|10||L||November 1, 2003||3–4 || align="left"| @ New Jersey Devils (2003–04) ||5–5–0–0 || 
|- align="center" bgcolor="#CCFFCC" 
|11||W||November 2, 2003||3–2 OT|| align="left"| @ New York Rangers (2003–04) ||6–5–0–0 || 
|- align="center" 
|12||T||November 4, 2003||4–4 OT|| align="left"|  Minnesota Wild (2003–04) ||6–5–1–0 || 
|- align="center" bgcolor="#CCFFCC" 
|13||W||November 6, 2003||2–1 || align="left"|  Phoenix Coyotes (2003–04) ||7–5–1–0 || 
|- align="center" bgcolor="#CCFFCC" 
|14||W||November 9, 2003||4–3 OT|| align="left"| @ Chicago Blackhawks (2003–04) ||8–5–1–0 || 
|- align="center" bgcolor="#CCFFCC" 
|15||W||November 11, 2003||4–3 || align="left"| @ San Jose Sharks (2003–04) ||9–5–1–0 || 
|- align="center" bgcolor="#FF6F6F"
|16||OTL||November 13, 2003||2–3 OT|| align="left"| @ Phoenix Coyotes (2003–04) ||9–5–1–1 || 
|- align="center" bgcolor="#CCFFCC" 
|17||W||November 15, 2003||3–0 || align="left"|  Dallas Stars (2003–04) ||10–5–1–1 || 
|- align="center" bgcolor="#CCFFCC" 
|18||W||November 18, 2003||2–1 OT|| align="left"|  Mighty Ducks of Anaheim (2003–04) ||11–5–1–1 || 
|- align="center" bgcolor="#CCFFCC" 
|19||W||November 20, 2003||4–3 || align="left"|  New York Rangers (2003–04) ||12–5–1–1 || 
|- align="center" bgcolor="#FFBBBB"
|20||L||November 22, 2003||0–2 || align="left"|  Los Angeles Kings (2003–04) ||12–6–1–1 || 
|- align="center" bgcolor="#FFBBBB"
|21||L||November 24, 2003||2–3 || align="left"|  Nashville Predators (2003–04) ||12–7–1–1 || 
|- align="center" bgcolor="#CCFFCC" 
|22||W||November 27, 2003||6–5 OT|| align="left"| @ Calgary Flames (2003–04) ||13–7–1–1 || 
|- align="center" bgcolor="#CCFFCC" 
|23||W||November 28, 2003||4–1 || align="left"| @ Edmonton Oilers (2003–04) ||14–7–1–1 || 
|- align="center" 
|24||T||November 30, 2003||1–1 OT|| align="left"|  New Jersey Devils (2003–04) ||14–7–2–1 || 
|-

|- align="center" 
|25||T||December 4, 2003||2–2 OT|| align="left"| @ San Jose Sharks (2003–04) ||14–7–3–1 || 
|- align="center" bgcolor="#CCFFCC" 
|26||W||December 6, 2003||5–1 || align="left"|  Columbus Blue Jackets (2003–04) ||15–7–3–1 || 
|- align="center" bgcolor="#CCFFCC" 
|27||W||December 8, 2003||4–1 || align="left"|  Washington Capitals (2003–04) ||16–7–3–1 || 
|- align="center" 
|28||T||December 11, 2003||1–1 OT|| align="left"| @ Vancouver Canucks (2003–04) ||16–7–4–1 || 
|- align="center" 
|29||T||December 13, 2003||1–1 OT|| align="left"| @ Calgary Flames (2003–04) ||16–7–5–1 || 
|- align="center" bgcolor="#FFBBBB"
|30||L||December 17, 2003||2–3 || align="left"|  Minnesota Wild (2003–04) ||16–8–5–1 || 
|- align="center" bgcolor="#FFBBBB"
|31||L||December 19, 2003||0–1 || align="left"| @ Mighty Ducks of Anaheim (2003–04) ||16–9–5–1 || 
|- align="center" 
|32||T||December 20, 2003||3–3 OT|| align="left"| @ Los Angeles Kings (2003–04) ||16–9–6–1 || 
|- align="center" 
|33||T||December 26, 2003||3–3 OT|| align="left"| @ St. Louis Blues (2003–04) ||16–9–7–1 || 
|- align="center" bgcolor="#CCFFCC" 
|34||W||December 27, 2003||3–2 OT|| align="left"|  Philadelphia Flyers (2003–04) ||17–9–7–1 || 
|- align="center" bgcolor="#FFBBBB"
|35||L||December 29, 2003||2–3 || align="left"|  Vancouver Canucks (2003–04) ||17–10–7–1 || 
|- align="center" bgcolor="#CCFFCC" 
|36||W||December 31, 2003||2–1 || align="left"| @ Calgary Flames (2003–04) ||18–10–7–1 || 
|-

|- align="center" bgcolor="#CCFFCC" 
|37||W||January 2, 2004||4–2 || align="left"| @ Vancouver Canucks (2003–04) ||19–10–7–1 || 
|- align="center" bgcolor="#CCFFCC" 
|38||W||January 4, 2004||3–1 || align="left"|  Minnesota Wild (2003–04) ||20–10–7–1 || 
|- align="center" bgcolor="#CCFFCC" 
|39||W||January 6, 2004||6–0 || align="left"|  Columbus Blue Jackets (2003–04) ||21–10–7–1 || 
|- align="center" bgcolor="#FF6F6F"
|40||OTL||January 8, 2004||3–4 OT|| align="left"| @ Nashville Predators (2003–04) ||21–10–7–2 || 
|- align="center" bgcolor="#CCFFCC" 
|41||W||January 10, 2004||4–2 || align="left"| @ Dallas Stars (2003–04) ||22–10–7–2 || 
|- align="center" bgcolor="#CCFFCC" 
|42||W||January 11, 2004||5–4 OT|| align="left"| @ Chicago Blackhawks (2003–04) ||23–10–7–2 || 
|- align="center" bgcolor="#CCFFCC" 
|43||W||January 13, 2004||3–1 || align="left"|  Mighty Ducks of Anaheim (2003–04) ||24–10–7–2 || 
|- align="center" bgcolor="#CCFFCC" 
|44||W||January 15, 2004||4–1 || align="left"|  Dallas Stars (2003–04) ||25–10–7–2 || 
|- align="center" bgcolor="#FFBBBB"
|45||L||January 17, 2004||1–2 || align="left"|  San Jose Sharks (2003–04) ||25–11–7–2 || 
|- align="center" bgcolor="#CCFFCC" 
|46||W||January 19, 2004||5–4 OT|| align="left"| @ Tampa Bay Lightning (2003–04) ||26–11–7–2 || 
|- align="center" bgcolor="#CCFFCC" 
|47||W||January 21, 2004||6–5 || align="left"| @ Florida Panthers (2003–04) ||27–11–7–2 || 
|- align="center" 
|48||T||January 22, 2004||1–1 OT|| align="left"| @ Atlanta Thrashers (2003–04) ||27–11–8–2 || 
|- align="center" bgcolor="#CCFFCC" 
|49||W||January 24, 2004||5–3 || align="left"| @ Pittsburgh Penguins (2003–04) ||28–11–8–2 || 
|- align="center" bgcolor="#CCFFCC" 
|50||W||January 27, 2004||3–1 || align="left"|  Edmonton Oilers (2003–04) ||29–11–8–2 || 
|- align="center" 
|51||T||January 29, 2004||3–3 OT|| align="left"| @ Los Angeles Kings (2003–04) ||29–11–9–2 || 
|- align="center" bgcolor="#FF6F6F"
|52||OTL||January 30, 2004||3–4 OT|| align="left"| @ Mighty Ducks of Anaheim (2003–04) ||29–11–9–3 || 
|-

|- align="center" bgcolor="#CCFFCC" 
|53||W||February 3, 2004||3–1 || align="left"|  Carolina Hurricanes (2003–04) ||30–11–9–3 || 
|- align="center" bgcolor="#FF6F6F"
|54||OTL||February 5, 2004||2–3 OT|| align="left"|  Detroit Red Wings (2003–04) ||30–11–9–4 || 
|- align="center" 
|55||T||February 10, 2004||1–1 OT|| align="left"|  New York Islanders (2003–04) ||30–11–10–4 || 
|- align="center" bgcolor="#CCFFCC" 
|56||W||February 12, 2004||4–0 || align="left"| @ St. Louis Blues (2003–04) ||31–11–10–4 || 
|- align="center" bgcolor="#CCFFCC" 
|57||W||February 14, 2004||5–2 || align="left"| @ Detroit Red Wings (2003–04) ||32–11–10–4 || 
|- align="center" bgcolor="#FFBBBB"
|58||L||February 16, 2004||0–1 || align="left"|  Vancouver Canucks (2003–04) ||32–12–10–4 || 
|- align="center" bgcolor="#FFBBBB"
|59||L||February 18, 2004||1–5 || align="left"|  Edmonton Oilers (2003–04) ||32–13–10–4 || 
|- align="center" bgcolor="#FFBBBB"
|60||L||February 20, 2004||1–5 || align="left"| @ Dallas Stars (2003–04) ||32–14–10–4 || 
|- align="center" bgcolor="#CCFFCC" 
|61||W||February 22, 2004||3–1 || align="left"| @ Minnesota Wild (2003–04) ||33–14–10–4 || 
|- align="center" bgcolor="#FFBBBB"
|62||L||February 24, 2004||0–2 || align="left"|  Calgary Flames (2003–04) ||33–15–10–4 || 
|- align="center" 
|63||T||February 26, 2004||2–2 OT|| align="left"|  St. Louis Blues (2003–04) ||33–15–11–4 || 
|- align="center" bgcolor="#FF6F6F"
|64||OTL||February 28, 2004||4–5 OT|| align="left"| @ Columbus Blue Jackets (2003–04) ||33–15–11–5 || 
|-

|- align="center" bgcolor="#FFBBBB"
|65||L||March 1, 2004||0–3 || align="left"|  Tampa Bay Lightning (2003–04) ||33–16–11–5 || 
|- align="center" 
|66||T||March 3, 2004||5–5 OT|| align="left"|  Vancouver Canucks (2003–04) ||33–16–12–5 || 
|- align="center" bgcolor="#CCFFCC" 
|67||W||March 5, 2004||5–1 || align="left"|  San Jose Sharks (2003–04) ||34–16–12–5 || 
|- align="center" bgcolor="#FFBBBB"
|68||L||March 7, 2004||1–7 || align="left"|  Calgary Flames (2003–04) ||34–17–12–5 || 
|- align="center" bgcolor="#CCFFCC" 
|69||W||March 8, 2004||9–2 || align="left"| @ Vancouver Canucks (2003–04) ||35–17–12–5 || 
|- align="center" bgcolor="#CCFFCC" 
|70||W||March 10, 2004||3–2 OT|| align="left"| @ Edmonton Oilers (2003–04) ||36–17–12–5 || 
|- align="center" bgcolor="#CCFFCC" 
|71||W||March 12, 2004||3–2 || align="left"| @ Phoenix Coyotes (2003–04) ||37–17–12–5 || 
|- align="center" bgcolor="#CCFFCC" 
|72||W||March 14, 2004||4–1 || align="left"|  Phoenix Coyotes (2003–04) ||38–17–12–5 || 
|- align="center" bgcolor="#FFBBBB"
|73||L||March 16, 2004||2–4 || align="left"| @ Montreal Canadiens (2003–04) ||38–18–12–5 || 
|- align="center" bgcolor="#FFBBBB"
|74||L||March 18, 2004||0–2 || align="left"| @ Ottawa Senators (2003–04) ||38–19–12–5 || 
|- align="center" bgcolor="#FFBBBB"
|75||L||March 20, 2004||2–5 || align="left"| @ Toronto Maple Leafs (2003–04) ||38–20–12–5 || 
|- align="center" 
|76||T||March 23, 2004||2–2 OT|| align="left"|  Chicago Blackhawks (2003–04) ||38–20–13–5 || 
|- align="center" bgcolor="#FFBBBB"
|77||L||March 25, 2004||1–3 || align="left"|  Detroit Red Wings (2003–04) ||38–21–13–5 || 
|- align="center" bgcolor="#FFBBBB"
|78||L||March 27, 2004||0–2 || align="left"| @ Detroit Red Wings (2003–04) ||38–22–13–5 || 
|- align="center" bgcolor="#CCFFCC" 
|79||W||March 29, 2004||2–1 || align="left"|  Los Angeles Kings (2003–04) ||39–22–13–5 || 
|- align="center" bgcolor="#FF6F6F"
|80||OTL||March 31, 2004||4–5 OT|| align="left"| @ Minnesota Wild (2003–04) ||39–22–13–6 || 
|-

|- align="center" bgcolor="#CCFFCC" 
|81||W||April 2, 2004||4–2 || align="left"| @ Columbus Blue Jackets (2003–04) ||40–22–13–6 || 
|- align="center" bgcolor="#FF6F6F"
|82||OTL||April 4, 2004||1–2 OT|| align="left"|  Nashville Predators (2003–04) ||40–22–13–7 || 
|-

|-
| Legend:

Playoffs

|- align="center" bgcolor="#CCFFCC"
| 1 || April 7 || Dallas || 1–3 || Colorado || || Aebischer || 18,007 || Avalanche lead 1–0 || 
|- align="center" bgcolor="#CCFFCC"
| 2 || April 9 || Dallas || 2–5 || Colorado || || Aebischer || 18,007 || Avalanche lead 2–0 || 
|- align="center" bgcolor="#CCFFCC"
| 3 || April 12 || Colorado || 4–3 || Dallas || OT || Aebischer || 18,532 || Avalanche lead 3–0 || 
|- align="center" bgcolor="#FFBBBB"
| 4 || April 14 || Colorado || 2–3 || Dallas || 2OT || Aebischer || 18,532 || Avalanche lead 3–1 || 
|- align="center" bgcolor="#CCFFCC"
| 5 || April 17 || Dallas || 1–5 || Colorado || || Aebischer || 18,007 || Avalanche win 4–1 || 
|-

|- align="center" bgcolor="#FFBBBB"
|1|| April 22 || Colorado || 2–5 || San Jose || || Aebischer || 17,496 || Sharks lead 1–0 || 
|- align="center" bgcolor="#FFBBBB"
|2|| April 24 || Colorado || 1–4 || San Jose || || Aebischer || 17,496 || Sharks lead 2–0 || 
|- align="center" bgcolor="#FFBBBB"
|3|| April 26 || San Jose || 1–0 || Colorado || || Aebischer || 18,007 || Sharks lead 3–0 || 
|- align="center" bgcolor="#CCFFCC"
|4|| April 28 || San Jose || 0–1 || Colorado || OT || Aebischer || 18,007 || Sharks lead 3–1 || 
|- align="center" bgcolor="#CCFFCC"
|5|| May 1 || Colorado || 2–1 || San Jose || OT || Aebischer || 17,496 || Sharks lead 3–2 || 
|- align="center" bgcolor="#FFBBBB"
|6|| May 4 || San Jose || 3–1 || Colorado || || Aebischer || 18,007 || Sharks win 4–2 || 
|-

|-
| Legend:

Player statistics

Scoring
 Position abbreviations: C = Center; D = Defense; G = Goaltender; LW = Left Wing; RW = Right Wing
  = Joined team via a transaction (e.g., trade, waivers, signing) during the season. Stats reflect time with the Avalanche only.
  = Left team via a transaction (e.g., trade, waivers, release) during the season. Stats reflect time with the Avalanche only.

Goaltending

Awards and records

Awards

Transactions
The Avalanche were involved in the following transactions from June 10, 2003, the day after the deciding game of the 2003 Stanley Cup Finals, through June 7, 2004, the day of the deciding game of the 2004 Stanley Cup Finals.

Trades

Players acquired

Players lost

Signings

Draft picks
Colorado's draft picks at the 2003 NHL Entry Draft held at the Gaylord Entertainment Center in Nashville, Tennessee.

See also
2003–04 NHL season

Notes

References

 
 

Colorado
Colorado
Colorado Avalanche seasons
Colorado Avalanche
Colorado Avalanche